Peter Kerr (born 25 September 1943) is a Scottish former professional footballer who played in the Football League for Reading.

References

1943 births
Living people
Scottish footballers
Association football forwards
English Football League players
Drumchapel Amateur F.C. players
Partick Thistle F.C. players
Third Lanark A.C. players
Reading F.C. players